Robert John Sprowl (born April 14, 1956) is an American former professional baseball player who was a pitcher in Major League Baseball from 1978 to 1981. He played for the Boston Red Sox and Houston Astros.

Amateur career
Sprowl attended George D. Chamberlain High School and was a star pitcher at the University of Alabama. In 1976, he played collegiate summer baseball with the Wareham Gatemen of the Cape Cod Baseball League, and received the league's Outstanding Pro Prospect award, and helped lead Wareham to the league title. Sprowl led the nation in strikeouts per nine innings in 1977, and was selected by the Red Sox in that year's amateur draft.

Professional career

Boston Red Sox
Sprowl is best known for losing two critical games in the 1978 pennant race between the Red Sox and the New York Yankees. Sprowl had compiled a 9-3 record in the AA Eastern League, and Boston's minor league organization claimed that he "had ice water in his veins," and manager Don Zimmer gave Sprowl three starts late in the season.

Sprowl's first start was in Baltimore on September 5, where he went seven innings, allowing four runs (three earned) on five hits and three walks, but took the loss when Orioles ace (and future Hall-of-Famer) Jim Palmer stifled the Red Sox, who got a second-inning run on a Dwight Evans RBI double, and then nothing more.  Sprowl carried the 1-0 lead into the bottom of the seventh, having allowed only two hits to that point, but then surrendered a game-tying home run to Lee May. Andres Mora then grounded through the legs of Red Sox third baseman Butch Hobson, reaching second base. Sprowl retired Rick Dempsey on a grounder to shortstop, as pinch-runner Mike Dimmel advanced to third, and then with the infield playing in, Carlos Lopez hit a soft liner that dropped for a hit and allowed Dimmel to score the eventual winning run.

The Red Sox players lauded Sprowl's effort and Zimmer gave him a second start, on September 10 against the New York Yankees, in the fourth game of a four-game series at Fenway Park. Sprowl walked the first two batters, got Thurman Munson to hit into a double play, but was unable to retire Reggie Jackson and escape the inning, surrendering an RBI single.  He then walked Lou Piniella and Chris Chambliss and was pulled for Bob Stanley, who allowed a hit to drive in two more runs, which were charged to Sprowl, before finishing the inning. The Yankees won the game 7-4, tying Boston for the division lead, and subjecting Zimmer to much second-guessing, due to Sprowl's perceived "nerves".

The Red Sox were 1.5 games behind the Yankees when they arrived in New York on September 15, which would have been Sprowl's next start. Zimmer this time started Luis Tiant on short rest; Tiant lasted only 3.2 innings and allowed all four runs in the Red Sox' 4-0 defeat. Sprowl was not used at all against the Yankees that weekend, but started the September 18 in Detroit. He allowed three runs in five innings, leaving with a 4-3 lead, and Boston won the game in 11 innings. This was Sprowl's last start of the season, as Zimmer went with a four-man rotation of Tiant, Mike Torrez, Dennis Eckersley, and Stanley for the final two weeks. Overall, Sprowl went 0-2 with a 6.39 earned run average with Boston.

Houston Astros
The following season, Sprowl was traded to the Astros. He pitched in 19 games over the next three years, mostly in middle relief.  He was sent back to the minors in 1982, and spent three seasons in the Astros and Baltimore Orioles organizations.  The closest he ever got to the majors again was three games for the Astros' top affiliate, the Tucson Toros.  He ended his major-league career with an 0-3 record in four years.

Coaching career
He is currently the head coach of the Shelton State Community College baseball team.

References

External links
, or Retrosheet, or Pelota Binaria (Venezuelan Winter League)

1956 births
Living people
Águilas del Zulia players
Alabama Crimson Tide baseball players
Baseball players from Ohio
Birmingham Barons players
Boston Red Sox players
Bristol Red Sox players
Cardenales de Lara players
American expatriate baseball players in Venezuela
Charleston Charlies players
Columbus Astros players
Florence Blue Jays players
Houston Astros players
Kinston Blue Jays players
Major League Baseball pitchers
Pawtucket Red Sox players
Sportspeople from Sandusky, Ohio
Tucson Toros players
Wareham Gatemen players
Winter Haven Red Sox players
Shelton State Buccaneers baseball coaches